During 2007, tropical cyclones formed within seven different tropical cyclone basins, located within various parts of the Atlantic, Pacific and Indian Oceans. During the year, a total of 129 systems formed with 79 of these developing further and were named by the responsible warning centre. The deadliest tropical cyclone of the year was Cyclone Sidr in the North Indian Ocean which killed 15,000 people in Bangladesh. The costliest tropical cyclone of the year was Cyclone Gonu in the North Indian Ocean, which caused more than $4.41 billion in damage after striking Oman, United Arab Emirates, Iran and Pakistan. The most active basin in the year was the Western Pacific, which documented 24 named systems. The North Atlantic had an above-average season with 15 named storms. The Eastern Pacific hurricane season experienced a below-average number of tropical storm intensity systems, numbering 11. Activity across the Southern Hemisphere's three basins – South-West Indian, Australian, and South Pacific – was fairly significant, with the regions recording 25 named storms altogether, with the most intense storm of the year coming from the Australian basin. Throughout 2007,  twenty one major tropical cyclones formed, including five Category 5 tropical cyclones in the year.

Global atmospheric and hydrological conditions

The ENSO during this year is mostly neutral, unlike the previous season.

Summary

North Atlantic Ocean 
The activity was a slightly above-average Atlantic hurricane season, featuring many weak and short-lived storms. Despite the high activity of weak storms during 2007, it was the first season to feature more than one Category 5 landfalling hurricane, a feat that would not be matched until ten years later. It produced 17 tropical cyclones, 15 tropical storms, six hurricanes, and two major hurricanes. The first system, Subtropical Storm Andrea, developed on May 9, while the last storm, Tropical Storm Olga, dissipated on December 13. The most intense hurricane, Dean, is tied for the eighth-most-intense Atlantic hurricane ever recorded as well as the third most intense Atlantic hurricane at landfall. The season was one of only seven on record for the Atlantic with more than one Category 5 hurricane. It was the second on record in which an Atlantic hurricane, Felix, and an eastern Pacific hurricane, Henriette, made landfall on the same day. September had a record-tying eight storms, although the strengths and durations of most of the storms were low. Aside from hurricanes Dean and Felix, none of the storms in the season exceeded Category 1 intensity.

Several storms made landfall or directly affected land. Hurricanes Dean and Felix made landfall at Category 5 intensity, causing severe damage in parts of Mexico and Central America, respectively. Both storm names, as well as Noel, the name of a hurricane that affected the Caribbean, were retired from the naming list of Atlantic hurricanes. The United States was affected by five cyclones, although the storms were generally weak; three tropical depressions and only two tropical storms, Barry and Gabrielle, and one hurricane, Humberto, made landfall in the country. Elsewhere, three storms directly affected Canada, although none severely. The combined storms killed at least 478 people and caused about $3.42 billion (2007 USD, $  USD) in damage.

Eastern Pacific Ocean 
The activity was a below-average Pacific hurricane season, featuring one major hurricane. The first tropical cyclone of the season, Alvin, developed on May 27, while the final system of the year, Kiko, dissipated on October 23. Due to unusually strong wind shear, activity fell short of the long-term average, with a total of 11 named storms, 4 hurricanes, and 1 major hurricane. At the time, 2007 featured the second-lowest value of the Accumulated cyclone energy (ACE) index since reliable records began in 1971. Two tropical cyclones – Cosme and Flossie – crossed into the central Pacific basin during the year, activity below the average of 4 to 5 systems. Impact during the season was relatively minimal. In early June, Tropical Storm Barbara moved ashore just northwest of the Mexico–Guatemala border, causing $55 million (2007 USD) in damage and 4 deaths. In late July, Cosme passed south of the island of Hawaii as a weakening tropical depression; light rain and increased surf resulted. A few days later, Dalila passed offshore the coastline of southwestern Mexico, killing 11 and causing minimal damage. Hurricane Flossie followed a similar track to Cosme in mid-August, producing gusty winds and light precipitation in Hawaii. Hurricane Henriette in early September produced torrential rainfall in southwestern Mexico, killing 6 and causing $25 million in damage. Baja California received moderate rains from Hurricane Ivo in mid-September, though no damage nor fatalities were reported. In mid-October, Tropical Storm Kiko passed just offshore the coastline of southwestern Mexico. Though no deaths were reported on the Mexico mainland, the storm capsized a ship with 30 people on board, 15 of whom were recovered dead, and 9 of whom were reported missing. Overall, the season ended with $80 million in damage and 49 deaths.

North Indian Ocean
The activity was an active year for this basin; it was the most destructive season in known history at this time, only for the 2008 season to surpass it the next year. 2007 was also the first season to have multiple Category 5 cyclones (by the Saffir–Simpson scale), and the two Category 5's, Sidr and Gonu, were also the first named Category 5 cyclones to form in their respective seas; Gonu in the Arabian Sea, and Sidr in the Bay of Bengal. Other notable storms of the season include Akash and Yemyin, both of which caused substantial damage and deaths. At least 4,545 deaths were reported, and damage was about 6.4 billion dollars.

Systems

January

February

March

April

Two tropical cyclones were formed and one was named in the month of April, becoming the least active in modern history. Cyclone Cliff caused widespread damage in Fiji and Tonga killing four people.

May

June

July

August

September

October

November

December

Global effects

See also

 Tropical cyclones by year
 List of earthquakes in 2007
 Tornadoes of 2007

Notes

1 Only systems that formed either on or after January 1, 2007 are counted in the seasonal totals.
2 Only systems that formed either before or on December 31, 2007 are counted in the seasonal totals.3 The wind speeds for this tropical cyclone/basin are based on the IMD Scale which uses 3-minute sustained winds.
4 The wind speeds for this tropical cyclone/basin are based on the Saffir Simpson Scale which uses 1-minute sustained winds.5The wind speeds for this tropical cyclone are based on Météo-France which uses gust winds.

References

External links 

Regional Specialized Meteorological Centers
 US National Hurricane Center – North Atlantic, Eastern Pacific
 Central Pacific Hurricane Center – Central Pacific
 Japan Meteorological Agency – NW Pacific
 India Meteorological Department – Bay of Bengal and the Arabian Sea
 Météo-France – La Reunion – South Indian Ocean from 30°E to 90°E
 Fiji Meteorological Service – South Pacific west of 160°E, north of 25° S

Tropical Cyclone Warning Centers
 Meteorology, Climatology, and Geophysical Agency of Indonesia – South Indian Ocean from 90°E to 141°E, generally north of 10°S
 Australian Bureau of Meteorology (TCWC's Perth, Darwin & Brisbane) – South Indian Ocean & South Pacific Ocean from 90°E to 160°E, generally south of 10°S
 Papua New Guinea National Weather Service – South Pacific Ocean from 141°E to 160°E, generally north of 10°S
 Meteorological Service of New Zealand Limited – South Pacific west of 160°E, south of 25°S

Tropical cyclones by year
2007 Atlantic hurricane season
2007 Pacific hurricane season
2007 Pacific typhoon season
2007 North Indian Ocean cyclone season
2006–07 Australian region cyclone season
2007–08 Australian region cyclone season
2006–07 South Pacific cyclone season
2007–08 South Pacific cyclone season
2006–07 South-West Indian Ocean cyclone season
2007–08 South-West Indian Ocean cyclone season
2007-related lists